A total solar eclipse took place on 13–14 November 2012 (UTC). Because it crossed the International Date Line it began in local time on November 14 west of the date line over northern Australia, and ended in local time on November 13 east of the date line near the west coast of South America. Its greatest magnitude was 1.0500, occurring only 12 hours before perigee (Perigee on 2012 Nov 14 at 10:11:48 UTC), with greatest eclipse totality lasting just over four minutes. A solar eclipse occurs when the Moon passes between Earth and the Sun, thereby totally or partly obscuring the image of the Sun for a viewer on Earth. A total solar eclipse occurs when the Moon's apparent diameter is larger than the Sun's, blocking all direct sunlight, turning day into darkness. Totality occurs in a narrow path across Earth's surface, with the partial solar eclipse visible over a surrounding region thousands of kilometres wide.

It was the 45th eclipse of the 133rd Saros cycle, which began with a partial eclipse on July 13, 1219 and will conclude with a partial eclipse on September 5, 2499.

Summary of the Total Solar Eclipse of 13 November 2012

Eclipse Characteristics 

Eclipse Magnitude = 1.05004

Eclipse Obscuration = 1.10259

Gamma = -0.37189

Saros Series = 133rd (45 of 72)

Conjunction Times 

Greatest Eclipse = 13 Nov 2012 22:11:48.2 UTC (22:12:55.2 TD)

Ecliptic Conjunction = 13 Nov 2012 22:07:59.9 UTC (22:09:06.9 TD)

Equatorial Conjunction = 13 Nov 2012 22:18:04.7 UTC (22:19:11.7 TD)

Geocentric Coordinates of Sun and Moon 

Sun right ascension = 15 hours, 18 minutes, 6.7 seconds

Moon right ascension = 15 hours, 17 minutes, 51.2 seconds

Earth's shadow right ascension = 3 hours, 18 minutes, 6.7 seconds

Sun declination = 18 degrees, 15 minutes, 2.6 seconds south of Celestial Equator

Moon declination = 18 degrees, 37 minutes, 29.5 seconds south of Celestial Equator

Earth's shadow declination = 18 degrees, 15 minutes, 2.6 seconds north of Celestial Equator

Sun diameter = 1939.8 arcseconds

Moon diameter = 2004.8 arcseconds

Geocentric Libration of Moon 

Latitude: 1.0 degrees south

Longitude: 0.5 degrees east

Direction: 16.5 (NNE)

Visibility 

For this eclipse, totality was visible from northern Australia to about 470 km north of the Chilean Juan Fernández Islands in the southern Pacific Ocean where totality ended. The most populous city to experience totality was Cairns, which had around 2 minutes of totality an hour after daybreak (06:39 AEST, 20:39 UTC) with the sun at an altitude of 14°. Norfolk Island, a small Pacific island east of Australia, experienced a partial eclipse with a maximum eclipse of 98% of the sun obscured at 08:37 NFT and an altitude of 42°.

New Zealand experienced a partial eclipse. Auckland had 84.8% of the sun obscured, whereas Wellington, Christchurch and Dunedin respectively had 71.2%, 61.9% and 52.9% of the sun obscured. Maximum eclipse over New Zealand occurred around 10:30 NZDT (21:30 UTC), with Auckland at 10:27, Wellington at 10:34, Christchurch at 10:35 and Dunedin at 10:36.

Most of Chile and parts of Argentina saw a partial eclipse at sunset. In some places over half the sun was obscured. In Chile, Talcahuano in Biobío saw 72% obscured, Castro in Los Lagos saw 56% obscured. Chilean coastal locations were ideally situated to observe an eclipsing sunset over the Pacific Ocean. Points further north, up to about Chañaral, saw the eclipse begin as the sun was setting.

West of the International Date Line the eclipse took place on the morning of November 14. The maximum eclipse totality, of duration 4 min 2 sec, occurred east of the International Date Line on November 13, approximately 2,000 km east of New Zealand, and 9,600 km west of Chile.

On the morning of November 14, skies in Auckland were cloudy, obscuring much of the eclipse, which peaked at 10:27 NZDT. Cloud also obscured the moment of totality at Cairns, disappointing many tourists that had flocked to the area. Eclipse chasers along the northern beaches up through to Port Douglas generally got a clear view however.

Photo gallery

Related eclipses

Eclipses of 2012 
 An annular solar eclipse on May 20.
 A partial lunar eclipse on June 4.
 A total solar eclipse on November 13.
 A penumbral lunar eclipse on November 28.

Solar eclipses of 2011–2014

Saros 133

Inex series

Tritos series

Metonic series

Notes

References

External links

 www.eclipser.ca: Jay Anderson 2012 November 13 Total Solar Eclipse
 timeanddate.com Nov 13 - Nov 14, 2012 Total Solar Eclipse — Animated eclipse viewer
 NASA video of eclipse, shot in northern Australia

2012 11 13

2012 in science
2012 11 13
November 2012 events
2012 in Australia